This is a list of the tallest players in National Basketball Association history. It is currently topped by the  Romanian Gheorghe Mureșan, taken by the Washington Bullets as the number 30 overall pick in the 1993 NBA draft.

However, only two are active as of the  season: Kristaps Porziņģis of the Washington Wizards; and Boban Marjanović of the Dallas Mavericks. The tallest player inducted into the Naismith Memorial Basketball Hall of Fame is  Yao Ming. In addition to Yao, Ralph Sampson and Arvydas Sabonis were the only other players 7 feet 3 inches or taller selected to the Hall of Fame.

Yasutaka Okayama, a  Japanese basketball player picked 171st overall in the seventh round of the 1981 NBA Draft by the Golden State Warriors, is the tallest player to ever be drafted for the NBA.  However, he never played in the NBA.

List

See also

List of tallest people
List of shortest players in National Basketball Association history
NBA records

Notes

References

NBA Players
Players,Tallest
Tallest
Tallest NBA
NBA